Budětsko is a municipality and village in Prostějov District in the Olomouc Region of the Czech Republic. It has about 400 inhabitants.

Administrative parts
Villages of Slavíkov and Zavadilka are administrative parts of Budětsko.

References

Villages in Prostějov District